Shaykh Tusi, full name Abu Jafar Muhammad Ibn Hassan Tusi, known as Shaykh al-Taʾifah was a prominent Persian scholar of the Twelver school of Shia Islam. He was known as the "sheikh of the sect (shaikh al-ta'ifah)", author of two of the four main Shi'i books of hadith, Tahdhib al-Ahkam and al-Istibsar, and is believed to have founded the hawza. He is also the founder of Shia jurisprudence.

Life
Shaykh Tusi was born 995 AD in Tus, Iran, and by 1018 AD he was living under the rule of the Buyid dynasty. Tusi's birth is considered a miracle, as he was born after the twelfth Imam of Shia, al-Mahdi's, supplications. He started his education in Tus, where he mastered many of the Islamic sciences of that period. He later studied in Baghdad, which was taken by Tughril-bek in 1055 AD. There he entered into the circles of Shaykh Al-Mufid as a paramount teacher. He started writing some of his earlier works in his twenties. By the time he was forty-two, he had learned from Shaykh Murtaza, attended the scholarly circle of Sunni scholars, and studied shafi fiqh. At this time many Muslim scholars in Baghdad were killed and Tusi's house burned down, along with his books and the works he had written in Baghdad. After the fall of Baghdad, he moved to al-Najaf, where he died on 2 December 1067.

Influence
Tusi had an important role in the formation and revival of Shia jurisprudence and law, as his life coincided with the burning of books and libraries. It is even said that he revived hadith and Islamic jurisprudence. He defended the application of jurisprudence in respect to religious laws. One of his main accomplishments was that he was successful in propagation and making his methodology of argumentation and inference coherent: he had given to Shaykh Mufid a definite formulation of ijtihad. His dominance was unrivaled for a long time and nearly all Islamic jurisprudence was affected by Tusi's opinions. Some of Tusi's works show that he was influenced by precedent jurists like Sallar Deylami. Tusi's influence persisted until Ibn Idris Hilli, who criticized some of Tusi's views.

Usuli School
In conflict between the Akhbari and Usuli schools, Tusi defended the Usuli and claimed that the rival Akhbari were literalists. He believed in principles of jurisprudence as the fundamental knowledge in acquiring judgment in Islam, and wrote in the introduction to one of his works:

He compared the positions of the different legal schools of Islam and showed that there is little difference between them. Tusi, like his masters, refuted the legal analogy (Qiyyas Fiqhi) in his manual of Usul Fiqh.

Importance of reason
His emphasis was on the rational dimension of religion, underlining that principles like the commandment to good and prohibition of evil are indispensable according to reason. Shaykh Tusi also used rational arguments to validate consensus (ijma) as derived from the principle of lutf. According to lutf, God must provide believers with the conditions for religious obedience.

Pioneering
Tusi was a leading intellectual who produced biographies (ilm-rijal), traditions, and compendia of knowledge (Fihrist). He also started developments that allowed Shia clerics to assume some of the roles previously permitted to only imams, such as collecting and distributing religious taxes, and organizing Friday prayers.

Najaf Seminary
According to some scholars, Tusi established the Hawzeh of Najaf after migrating from Baghdad.

Works
Tusi wrote over fifty works in different Islamic branches of knowledge such as philosophy, hadith, theology, biography, historiography, exegesis, and tradition. Of the four authoritative sources of the Shiites, two are by Tusi: the basic reference books Tahdhib al-Ahkam and Al-Istibsar. Both of them pertain to hadiths of Islamic jurisprudence. Other books include:

Al-Nihayah
Al-Tibyan Fi Tafsir al-Quran
Al-Istibsar in 4 volumes
Tahdhib Al-osul in two volumes
Oddat Al-osul
Al-fatawa
Al-Mabsut
Al-Iqtisad Al Hadi Ila Tariq Al Rashad
Kitab al-Ghayba
Ekhtiyar Ma'refat Al- Rijal

See also
 Shia Islam
 Ja'fari jurisprudence
 The Four Books
 Holiest sites in Islam
 Sayyid Murtadhā
 Shaykh al-Mufīd
 Shaykh al-Sadūq
 Muhammad al-Kulaynī
 Allāmah Majlisī
 Shaykh al-Hur al-Āmilī
 Shaykh Nasīr ad-Dīn Tūsi

References

External links
 Shaykh Tusi

996 births
1067 deaths
People from Tus, Iran
Iranian Shia scholars of Islam
Iranian scholars
11th-century Iranian people
Scholars under the Buyid dynasty
11th-century Muslim scholars of Islam
Muslim scholars of Islamic jurisprudence